Niphona borneana is a species of beetle in the family Cerambycidae. It was described by Stephan von Breuning in 1973. It is known from Borneo.

References

borneana
Beetles described in 1973